Athletics is one of the sports at the quadrennial Islamic Solidarity Games competition. Athletics competitions was inaugurated since the first edition in 2005.

Editions

Games records
Key:

Men

Women

Mixed

References

 
Islamic Solidarity Games
Islamic Solidarity Games
Islamic Solidarity Games
Islamic Solidarity Games